Chiniot Bridge (also known as Rabwah Bridge) is a concrete made bridge located in the Chiniot passing over the Chenab River in Pakistan. It is about 520 meters in length and 17.8 meters wide. It is a two-lane bridge with 26 spans of 40 meters each. It is located at 4.6 km from Khatm-e-Nabuwat Chowk and 3.3 km from Railway Station.

References

External links 
 Images of Chiniot Bridge

Chiniot District
Bridges in Pakistan
Bridges over the Chenab River